Duchy of Białogarda was a duchy in the Pomerelia centred around its capital, Białogarda. It was formed in 1233 from the partition of the Duchy of Świecie and Lubiszewo, and existed until 1262 when it was incorporated into the State of the Teutonic Order. Its only ruler was duke Racibor of Białogarda of the Samboride dynasty.

History 
The state was formed from the partition of the Duchy of Świecie and Lubiszewo, with Racibor of Białogarda being made its duke by his older brother, Swietopelk II, duke of Gdańsk. Białogarda had become the capital of the country. In 1237, persuaded by his brother, duke Sambor II, duke of Lubiszewo, Racibor had invaded Pomerania-Schlawe. Alternatively, according to some historians, he could be Ratibor II, who ruled Pomerania-Schlawe, after the death of Bogislaw III in 1223.

On 1 March 1238, Sambor II, together with Mecklenburg troops, had traveled to Białogarda, in order to pursue Racibor to starting a war against Swietopelk II. Soon after, Swietopelk had destroyed Racibor's army and conquered Białogarda. Following that, Racibor got exiled to the Duchy of Kuyavia, where he joined the court of Casimir I. Between March and April 1239, he had pledged the loyalty to Swietopelk II, after which, he was reestablished as duke of Białogarda.

On 28 August 1243, Racibor, Casimir I and Heinrich IV von Weida, Landmeister of the Teutonic Order, had formed an alliance against Swietopelk II. In the agreement, Racibor was promised the land of Wyszogród, in case of the war. In the response, Swietopelk II had captured and imprisoned Racibor, claiming that the alliance broke their previous agreements. He got released around 1248, once again regaining the rule over the Duchy of Białogarda. Following that, Racibor remained an ally to Swietopelk. In 1262, he had joined the Teutonic Order, giving lands of his duchy to the State of the Teutonic Order.

Citations

Notes

References

Bibliography 
 E. Rymar, Rodowód książąt pomorskich
 Labuda Gerard, Mściwoj I. Słownik biograficzny Pomorza Nadwiślańskiego, vol. 3, Gdańsk. 1997.
 Józef Wójcicki, Dzieje Polski nad Bałtykiem. Warsaw. Książka i Wiedza. 1989

Former countries in Europe
Former monarchies of Europe
Pomeranian duchies
States and territories established in 1233
States and territories disestablished in 1238
States and territories established in 1239
States and territories disestablished in 1262
13th-century establishments in Europe
13th-century disestablishments in Europe